Borshchahivka is a neighborhood located to the west and south-west of Kyiv, the capital of Ukraine. It is part of the city's Sviatoshynskyi District.

The neighborhood is named after a large village that was founded at the site. The contemporary urban look comes from the 1960s and 1970s. The neighborhood is divided into two sections: Mykilska and Pivdenna (South) Borshchahivka. A village named Petropavlivska Borshchahivka also exists nearby, but it does not belong to Kyiv.

A fast tram line connects Borshchahivka with Kyiv's central railway station.

In Polish Slownik geograficzny (Geographic Dictionary), there is a mentioning of locality named as Borzakowszczyzna near Pyrohiv (Pirogow), which is a property of Kyiv Cave Monastery. The locality was named after the monasterial scribe Vasyl Borzakiv. At the same time, the dictionary has another term "Borszczhowka" which is described as an old urban place from old princely Ruthenia belonging to Witold Svidrigiello and later Princely House of Olelkovich. This Borszczahowka is stretching from the mouth of river Horikhuvatka towards Ros River, on the administrative border between counties Skvyra and Tarashcha.

See also
 Saltivka

External links
 Page 338 (Borzakowszczyna). Polish Slownik geograficzny.
 Page 324 (Borszczahowka). Polish Slownik geograficzny.

Neighborhoods in Kyiv